The 1985 Major League Baseball All-Star Game was the 56th playing of the game, annually played between the All-Stars of the National League and the All-Stars of the American League. The game was played on July 16, 1985, in the Hubert H. Humphrey Metrodome in Minneapolis, Minnesota, home of the Minnesota Twins.

Roster
Players in italics have since been inducted into the National Baseball Hall of Fame.

Starters

National League
NL Batting Order
1. Tony Gwynn, OF, San Diego Padres
2. Tom Herr, 2B, St. Louis Cardinals
3. Steve Garvey, 1B, San Diego Padres
4. Dale Murphy, OF, Atlanta Braves
5. Darryl Strawberry, OF, New York Mets
6. Graig Nettles, 3B, San Diego Padres
7. Terry Kennedy, C, San Diego Padres (in place of Gary Carter)
8. Ozzie Smith, SS, St. Louis Cardinals
9. LaMarr Hoyt, P, San Diego Padres

American League
AL Batting Order
1. Rickey Henderson, OF, New York Yankees
2. Lou Whitaker, 2B, Detroit Tigers
3. George Brett, 3B, Kansas City Royals
4. Eddie Murray, 1B, Baltimore Orioles
5. Cal Ripken Jr., SS, Baltimore Orioles
6. Dave Winfield, OF, New York Yankees
7. Jim Rice, OF, Boston Red Sox
8. Carlton Fisk, C, Chicago White Sox (in place of Lance Parrish)
9. Jack Morris, P, Detroit Tigers

Pitchers

National League
Joaquín Andújar, St. Louis Cardinals (did not attend)
Ron Darling, New York Mets
Scott Garrelts, San Francisco Giants
Rich Gossage, San Diego Padres
Dwight Gooden, New York Mets
LaMarr Hoyt, San Diego Padres (starting pitcher)
Jeff Reardon, Montreal Expos
Nolan Ryan, Houston Astros
Fernando Valenzuela, Los Angeles Dodgers

American League
Bert Blyleven, Cleveland Indians
Willie Hernández, Detroit Tigers
Jay Howell, Oakland Athletics
Jimmy Key, Toronto Blue Jays
Donnie Moore, California Angels
Jack Morris, Detroit Tigers (starting pitcher)
Dan Petry, Detroit Tigers
Dave Stieb, Toronto Blue Jays

Reserves

National League
Tony Peña, C, Pittsburgh Pirates
Ozzie Virgil Jr., C, Philadelphia Phillies
Jack Clark, 1B, St. Louis Cardinals
Pete Rose, 1B, Cincinnati Reds
Ryne Sandberg, 2B, Chicago Cubs
Garry Templeton, SS, San Diego Padres
Tim Wallach, 3B, Montreal Expos
José Cruz, OF, Houston Astros
Pedro Guerrero, OF, Los Angeles Dodgers
Willie McGee, OF, St. Louis Cardinals
Dave Parker, OF, Cincinnati Reds
Tim Raines, OF, Montreal Expos
Glenn Wilson, OF, Philadelphia Phillies

American League
Rich Gedman, C, Boston Red Sox
Ernie Whitt, C, Toronto Blue Jays
Cecil Cooper, 1B, Milwaukee Brewers
Don Mattingly, 1B, New York Yankees
Damaso Garcia, 2B, Toronto Blue Jays
Alan Trammell, SS, Detroit Tigers
Wade Boggs, 3B, Boston Red Sox
Paul Molitor, 3B, Milwaukee Brewers
Harold Baines, OF, Chicago White Sox
Phil Bradley, OF, Seattle Mariners
Tom Brunansky, OF, Minnesota Twins
Gary Ward, OF, Texas Rangers

Umpires

Game summary

The National League won the game 6–1, with the winning pitcher being LaMarr Hoyt of the San Diego Padres and the losing pitcher being Jack Morris of the Detroit Tigers. Hoyt also won the game's MVP award. The National League was managed by the Padres' Dick Williams, while the American League was managed by Sparky Anderson of the Tigers.

Williams was backed by coaches Jim Frey and Bob Lillis and Anderson was aided by coaches Bobby Cox and Dick Howser.

The teams' honorary captains each starred in the 1965 All-Star game, also held in Minnesota -- Harmon Killebrew for the AL, and Sandy Koufax for the NL.  In the game two decades ago, Koufax earned the NL win, and Killebrew hit the AL's second home run.

Attendance was announced as 54,960.

External links
Baseball Almanac
Baseball-Reference.com

Major League Baseball All-Star Game
Baseball competitions in Minneapolis
All-Star Game
Major League Baseball All Star Game
July 1985 sports events in the United States
1980s in Minneapolis